The Fokker CXIV-W was a reconnaissance seaplane produced in the Netherlands in the 1930s. It was a conventional, single-bay biplane with staggered wings of unequal span braced by N-struts. The pilot and observer sat in tandem, open cockpits, and the undercarriage consisted of twin pontoons. 11 of the 24 examples produced were stationed in the Dutch East Indies. These were later joined by 12 aircraft that had escaped to the UK following the German invasion of the Netherlands in 1940. All C.XIVs were destroyed during the Japanese invasion of the Dutch East Indies.

Operators

Royal Netherlands Navy

Specifications

See also

References
 
 

1930s Dutch military reconnaissance aircraft
Floatplanes
C 14
Single-engined tractor aircraft
Biplanes
Aircraft first flown in 1937